Tan-y-groes (or Tanygroes) is a hamlet in the  community of Penbryn, Ceredigion, Wales, which is  east of Cardigan on the A487 trunk road. Tan-y-groes is represented in the Senedd by Elin Jones (Plaid Cymru) and the Member of Parliament is Ben Lake (Plaid Cymru).

Etymology
The name derives from the Welsh language and means "under the cross".

Internal Fire Museum of Power
The Internal Fire Museum of Power in Tan-y-groes displays a collection of internal combustion engines and steam engines, many of which are operational.

Distillery
The 'In the Welsh Wind' distillery in Tan-y-groes makes gin, whisky and other spirits. It was established in 2018 and in 2021 received permission to extend and develop its building.

References

Villages in Ceredigion